Colonel Hugh Henry Mitchell, CB (9 June 1770 – 20 April 1817) was a British military leader, of Irish birth, who fought in several decisive battles during the Napoleonic Wars, including the Battle of Salamanca and the Battle of Waterloo, and was commended by the Duke of Wellington.

Career
He was born in 1770 in Dublin. His father was Hugh Henry Mitchell senior, a prosperous Irish banker and prominent member of the Irish House of Commons. His mother was Margaret Gordon of Ellon. His father suffered severe financial losses in the late 1770s, and it was his uncle, General Alexander Gordon who encouraged him to join the army at the tender age of eleven.

Mitchell was commissioned in January 1782 as an ensign, in the 101st Regiment of Foot. He was promoted to lieutenant in June 1783 and served in Canada from 1786 to 1796. He became a major on 17 March 1804. He fought in the Egyptian Campaign in 1801 and was promoted to lieutenant-colonel on 12 December 1805 in the service of the 26th Regiment of Foot. Mitchell commanded a battalion of the 26th Regiment of Foot from 1805 to 1811 and the 51st Regiment of Foot from 13 June 1811 until 1814, throughout the Peninsular War. He gained the rank of colonel on 4 June 1813.

In the Waterloo campaign Mitchell commanded the 4th Brigade of the 4th Division, consisting of the 3rd battalion of the 14th foot, the 1st Battalion of 23rd Fusiliers, and the 1st Battalion of the 51st Light Infantry, a total of around 2,000 officers and men. "As the light was beginning to fail (on 17 June 1815) Colonel Mitchell led his brigade to the position ... on the extreme right near Braine-l'Alleud, and here the regiments bivouaced for the night, the rain continuing to fall in torrents." Mitchell's brigade was engaged early in the battle when the French attacked Hougoumont Farm."
He was conferred with the honour of Companion of the Order of the Bath on 4 June 1815 and received the Russian Order of St. Vladimir. He was one of the few officers below the rank of general to be mentioned by the Duke of Wellington's Waterloo Dispatch.

He died on 20 April 1817 at age 46 at Queen Anne Street, London, England.

Family
Mitchell married Lady Harriet Isabella Somerset, daughter of Henry Somerset, 5th Duke of Beaufort and Elizabeth Boscawen, on 3 July 1804. The children of Colonel Hugh Henry Mitchell and Lady Harriet Isabella Somerset were:

 Margaret Harriet Isabella Mitchell (4 June 1806 – 29 June 1876), who married, on 15 January 1833, the Rev. Thomas Walpole, Canon of Winchester Cathedral, elder brother of Home Secretary Spencer Horatio Walpole, and had issue.
 Charlotte Gertrude Elizabeth Mitchell (6 December 1807 – 4 August 1876), who married, on 18 April 1825, John Leveson-Gower and had issue.
 Col. Hugh Andrew Robert Mitchell (12 September 1816 – 21 August 1857), of the Grenadier Guards, who married, on 30 July 1844, Sarah Lowndes and had issue.

References

External links
 http://www.thepeerage.com/p1213.htm#i12129
 http://www.wtj.com/archives/wellington/1815_06f.htm
 https://www.findagrave.com/memorial/198259224/hugh-henry-mitchell

1770 births
1817 deaths
British Army commanders of the Napoleonic Wars
People of the Peninsular War
Companions of the Order of the Bath
Recipients of the Order of St. Vladimir, 3rd class
Recipients of the Order of St. Anna
King's Own Yorkshire Light Infantry officers
Military personnel from Dublin (city)